The Tyne Bridge is a through arch bridge over the River Tyne in North East England, linking Newcastle upon Tyne and Gateshead. The bridge was designed by the engineering firm Mott, Hay and Anderson, who later designed the Forth Road Bridge, and was built by Dorman Long and Co. of Middlesbrough. The bridge was officially opened on 10 October 1928 by King George V and has since become a defining symbol of Tyneside. It is ranked as the tenth tallest structure in Newcastle.

History of construction

The earliest bridge across the Tyne, Pons Aelius, was built by the Romans on the site of the present Swing Bridge around 122.

A series of wooden bridges were lost to fire or flood, and plans for a stone bridge were begun in about 1250 with support from local landowners, and the Bishops of Durham, York and Caithness. The stone bridge was constructed but then damaged by flood in 1339. Repairs proved costly and took place in sections: it was not fully repaired, as a part stone and part wooden bridge, until the 16th century and was part destroyed by a great flood in November 1771.

Following this, new stone bridge was begun after the city council petitioned Parliament. The foundation stone on the north side was laid by Sir Matthew White Ridley on 25 April 1775, with the south side foundation stone laid in 1776. Works were completed by 13 September 1779, at an estimated cost of between £30,000 and £60,000.

Work on a modern bridge started in August 1925, with Dorman Long acting as the building contractors. Despite the dangers of the building work, only one worker, Nathaniel Collins, a father of four and a local scaffolder from South Shields, died in the building of this structure.

The Tyne Bridge was designed by Mott, Hay and Anderson, comparable to their Sydney Harbour Bridge version. These bridges derived their design from the Hell Gate Bridge in New York City. The Dorman Long team was also notable for including Dorothy Buchanan, the first female member of the Institution of Civil Engineers, joining in 1927; in addition to her contribution to the Tyne Bridge, she served as part of the team for the Sydney Harbour Bridge and the Lambeth Bridge in London.

The bridge was completed on 25 February 1928, and officially opened on 10 October that year by King George V and Queen Mary, who were the first to use the roadway, travelling in their Ascot Landau. The opening ceremony was attended by 20,000 schoolchildren who had been given the day off. Movietone News recorded the speech given by the King.

The Tyne Bridge's towers were built of Cornish granite and were designed by local architect Robert Burns Dick as warehouses with five storeys. But, the inner floors of the warehouses in the bridge's towers were not completed and, as a result, the storage areas were never used. A lift for passengers and goods was built in the North tower to provide access to the Quayside; it is no longer in use. Although a lift shaft was also included in the South tower no lift was ever installed.

The bridge's design uses a parabolic arch.

The bridge was originally painted green with special paint made by J. Dampney, Tonbridge, Tingate Co. of Gateshead. The same colours were used to paint the bridge in 2000.

Technical information

History
In 2012, the largest Olympic rings in the UK were erected on the bridge. The rings were manufactured by commercial signage specialists Signmaster ED Ltd of Kelso. This was in preparation for Newcastle hosting the Olympic football tournament, and the Olympic torch relay, in which Bear Grylls zipwired from the top of the arch, to Gateshead quayside.

On 28 June 2012, a large lightning bolt struck the Tyne Bridge. It lit up the roads as the sky was very dark. The bolt, part of a super-cell thunderstorm, came with heavy rain – a month's worth of rainfall in just two hours – causing flash flooding on Tyneside.

In 2015, Newcastle upon Tyne was a host city for the Rugby World Cup. Three matches were played at St James's Park, the home of Newcastle United Football Club. In recognition, a large illuminated sign was erected on Tyne Bridge. Similarly, the bridge was depicted in an official BBC trailer for the 2021 Rugby League World Cup (in reference to Newcastle being one of the host cities).

On 13 November 2017, the Tyne Bridge was the venue for the Freedom on the Tyne finale, the finale of the 2017 Freedom City festival. The festival commemorated Newcastle's civil rights history and the 50 years since Dr Martin Luther King's visit to Newcastle, where King received his honorary degree from Newcastle University.

Newcastle University and Freedom City 2017 wanted to use the Tyne Bridge to symbolically hark back in history to Edmund Pettus Bridge in Selma, Alabama where King was involved in one of the key moments for the struggle for civil rights in 1965. 24 roads around the Tyne Bridge were closed for the day long event. The Freedom of the Tyne event featured the many civil right stories from history. The final event, revolved around the Jarrow Crusade which was described as a memorable closing to the finale.

In June 2022 it was announced that the bridge will be refurbished, involving improvements to the structure and a full repainting. Funding will come from the Department for Transport and the councils of Newcastle and Gateshead.

Grade II* listed by Historic England
On 23 August 2018, the bridge was Grade II* listed by Historic England. The rating means the bridge is a particular important structure of more than special interest. The bridge was upgraded by the Department for Digital, Culture, Media and Sport on the advice of Historic England.

The bridge was upgraded to Grade II* for architectural and historical interest, as outlined here:

Kittiwake colony
The bridge and nearby structures are used as a nesting site by a colony of around 700 pairs of black-legged kittiwakes, the furthest inland in the world. The colony featured in the BBC's Springwatch programme in 2010. Several groups, including the Natural History Society of Northumbria and local Wildlife Trusts, formed a "Tyne Kittiwake Partnership" to safeguard the colony. A proposal for a tower to be built as an alternative nesting site was made in 2011, and in November 2015 a neighbouring hotel submitted a planning application for measures to discourage the birds.

References

Further reading
 Addyman, J. and Fawcett, B. The High Level Bridge and Newcastle Central Station: 150 Years Across the Tyne. By the North Eastern Railway Association for the High Level Bridge. 1999. .
 Linsley, S. Spanning the Tyne: Building of the Tyne Bridge, 1925-28. Newcastle Libraries and Information Service, Newcastle City Council. 1998. .
 Manders, F. & Potts, R. Crossing the Tyne. Tyne Bridge Publishing. 2001. .
 Anderson, D. Tyne Bridge, Newcastle in "Proceedings of the Institution of Civil Engineers", March 1930 v. 230 
 Prade, Marcel Les grands ponts du monde: Ponts remarquables d'Europe, Brissaud, Poitiers (France), 1990; pp. 274

External links

 Databases: Bridges On The Tyne, Engineering Timelines, and 
 Articles: BBC Inside Out - Tyne Bridge
 .

Images
 Historic photographs:  Dorman Long collection, Pictures of Gateshead
 Aerial photographs: Britain from Above - aerial views of the bridge under construction and later in the 1930s, from the Aerofilms archive of English Heritage
 Photographs of Tyne Bridges: Peter Loud
 Video: BBC - Nation on Film

Bridges in Tyne and Wear
Bridges completed in 1928
Transport in Tyne and Wear
Grade II* listed buildings in Tyne and Wear
Buildings and structures in Newcastle upon Tyne
Through arch bridges in the United Kingdom
Crossings of the River Tyne
Grade II* listed bridges in England